St Columba's College is a co-educational 4–18 private, Catholic day school and sixth form in St Albans, Hertfordshire, England. It was founded in 1939 by Phillip O’Neil and taken over by the Brothers of the Sacred Heart in 1955. It is a member of the Headmasters' and Headmistresses' Conference.

Facing St Albans Cathedral across the River Ver, the college is built around two historic houses, Watling House and Iona House.

History

Originally a boys'-only school, St Columba's College announced its move to co-education in June 2020, with the first girls being admitted as pupils in 2021. The school originally opened in 1939, on Beaconsfield Road before moving to its current site in 1948. In 1955, it was taken over by the Brothers of the Sacred Heart (New England Province) who also purchased the neighbouring Watling House and undertook major construction across the school site. St Columba's College also expanded to include a primary school, first named 'Sacred Heart Junior School' before being renamed to 'St Columba's College Preparatory School'. Since then they have continued to expand the facilities; building separate Sixth Form, English and Science & DT blocks. In 2013, the college completed a major building project, refurbishing the main school hall as-well as introducing new classrooms, meeting and seminar rooms, offices and a Fitness Suite. In 2021 the Sixth Form Centre was refurbished, creating new learning, collaboration and social spaces for the students. In 2022 the College is building new sports pitches.

Houses

Prior to 2005, both the college and the prep had the same four houses, named after four English Catholic martyrs:
 Alban
 Becket
 Fisher
 More

At the start or the 2005–6 academic year, a new house system was introduced in the senior school, to provide smaller tutor groups for greater personal development of students, as well as to cater for an increase in numbers of students entering.  The prep school kept the original houses.
The new houses are named after other Brothers of the Sacred Heart schools in North America (given in brackets):
 Charles (Mount Saint Charles Academy)
 Guertin (Bishop Guertin High School)
 Joseph (St. Joseph High School)
 Martin (Brother Martin High School), formerly Vandebilt (Vandebilt Catholic High School), until 2011
  McClancy (Monsignor McClancy Memorial High School)
  Stanislaus (Saint Stanislaus College)

The six senior houses create the pastoral structure of the senior school, each overseen by the Head and Deputy Head of House. Pupils with older siblings follow them into the same House. Pupils remain in their House throughout their time in the Senior school, but have different tutors as they progress to meet the needs of different age groups. Students' houses are represented in the school uniform by the colour of their tie or blazer badge (taking the respective colours as given above).  Prep and sixth form students have their own school ties and blazer badges, as do prefects.

Curriculum 
St Columba's College provides a broad curriculum linked to the national curriculum and also to Diocese of Westminster rules – mandating the teaching of Religious Studies for a set period every week. More than 20 subjects are offered at GCSE, including the core subjects of English (Literature and Language), Mathematics, Science and Religious Studies. Additional subjects offered at A Level include Drama & Theatre, Psychology and Sociology. Sixth Form students can also study towards gaining the Certificate of Financial Studies and the Extended Project Qualification (EPQ).

In 2021 St Columba's Prep School became a member school in the Pre-Senior Baccalaureate (PSB) group and has embedded the framework in the curriculum since September 2021.

Notable alumni 

Former pupils of the school are called Old Columbans.
 The Rt. Hon. Conor Burns MP, Member of Parliament for Bournemouth West, Minister of State for Northern Ireland and former Minister of State for International Trade.
 Bill Grimsey, CEO of Focus (DIY), formerly CEO of Wickes, The Big Food Group and Iceland.
Noni Madueke, footballer
 Mark Lawson, broadcaster
 Mick Luckhurst, former American football player
 Jim McCaffrey, former professional footballer
 John Payne (singer), singer with rock band Asia
 Julian Perretta, singer-songwriter
 Saving Aimee, band
 Matt Ball, footballer
 Colin Grant, author
 Peter Townsend, golfer.
 Sacha Baron Cohen, actor, attended St. Columba's Prep School

References

External links 
 

Roman Catholic private schools in the Archdiocese of Westminster
Member schools of the Headmasters' and Headmistresses' Conference
Private schools in Hertfordshire
Boys' schools in Hertfordshire
Educational institutions established in 1939
1939 establishments in England
Schools in St Albans